Anonymous social media is a subcategory of social media wherein the main social function is to share and interact around content and information anonymously on mobile and web-based platforms. Another key aspect of anonymous social media is that content or information posted is not connected with particular online identities or profiles.

Background 
Appearing very early on the web as mostly anonymous-confession websites, this genre of social media has evolved into various types and formats of anonymous self-expression. One of the earliest anonymous social media forums was 2channel, which was first introduced online on May 30, 1999, as a Japanese text board forum.

With the way digital content is consumed and created continuously changing, the trending shift from web to mobile applications is also affecting anonymous social media. This can be seen as anonymous blogging, or various other format based content platforms such as nameless question and answer online platforms like Ask.fm introduce mobile versions of their services and the number of new networks joining the anonymous social sharing scene continues to grow rapidly.

Degrees of anonymity 

Across different forms of anonymous social media there are varying degrees of anonymity. Some applications, such as Librex, require users to sign up for an account, even though their profile is not linked to their posts. While these applications remain anonymous, some of these sites can sync up with the user's contact list or location to develop a context within the social community and help personalize the user's experience, such as Yik Yak or Secret.  Other sites, such as 4chan and 2channel, allow for a purer form of anonymity as users are not required to create an account, and posts default to the username of "Anonymous".  While users can still be traced through their IP address, there are anonymizing services like I2P or various proxy server services that encrypt a user's identity online by running it through different routers. Secret users must provide a phone number or email when signing up for the service, and their information is encrypted into their posts. Stylometry poses a risk to the anonymity or pseudonymity of social media users, who may be identifiable by writing style; in turn, they may use adversarial stylometry to resist such identification.

Controversy 
Apps such as Formspring, Ask, Sarahah, Whisper, and Secret have elicited discussion around the rising popularity of anonymity apps, including debate and anticipation about this social sharing class. As more and more platforms join the league of anonymous social media, there is growing concern about the ethics and morals of anonymous social networking as cases of cyber-bullying, and personal defamation occurs. Formspring, also known as spring.me, and Ask.fm have both been associated with teen suicides as a result of cyberbullying on the sites. Formspring has been associated with at least three teen suicides and Ask.fm with at least five. 

For instance, the app Secret got shut down due to its escalated use of cyberbullying. The app Yik Yak has also helped to contribute to more cyberbullying situations and, in turn, was blocked on some school networks Their privacy policy meant that users could not be identified without a subpoena, search warrant, or court order. Another app called After School also sparked controversy for its app design that lets students post any anonymous content. Due to these multiple controversies, the app has been removed from both Apple and Google app stores. As the number of people using these platforms multiplies, unintended uses of the apps have increased, urging popular networks to enact in-app warnings and prohibit the use for middle and high school students. 70% of teens admit to making an effort to conceal their online behavior from their parents. Even Snapchat has same relation to the health of children after using social media. This an app that is meant to be quick and simple but in many ways it can be overwhelming. A person can post something, and it be gone in seconds. Oftentimes, the post that was made was inappropriate and harmful to another person. It's a never-ending cycle. 

Some of these apps have also been criticized for causing chaos in American schools, such as lockdowns and evacuations. In order to limit the havoc caused, anonymous apps are currently removing all abusive and harmful posts. Apps such as Yik Yak, Secret, and Whisper are removing these posts by outsourcing the job of content supervision to oversea surveillance companies. These companies hire a team of individuals to inspect and remove any harmful or abusive posts. Furthermore, algorithms are also used to detect and remove any abusive posts the individuals may have missed. Another method used by the anonymous app named Cloaq to reduce the number of harmful and abusive posts is to limit the number of users that can register during a certain period. Under this system, all contents are still available to the public, but only registered users can post. Other websites such as YouTube have gone on to create new policies regarding anonymity. YouTube now does not allow anonymous comments on videos. Users must have a Google account to like, dislike, comment or reply to comments on videos. Once a sign-in user "likes" a video, it will be added to that user's 'Liked video playlist.' YouTube changed their "Liked video playlist" policy in December 2019, allowing a signed-in user to keep their "Liked video playlist" private.

Historically, these controversies and the rise of cyberbullying have been blamed on the anonymous aspect of many social media platforms, but about half of US adult online harassment cases do not involve anonymity, and researchers have found that if targeted harassment exists offline it will also be found online, because online harassment is a reflection of existing prejudices.

Prospective uses 
There are also promising opportunities anonymous social media networks offer regarding the authentic human connection and semi-anonymous communication. For example, an app called Memo allows for employees of specific workplaces to anonymously tell employers and other employees how they feel in their respective workplace. This sort of safe, anonymous place allows for more transparency in the workplace among employers and employees. Other anonymous social media formats are not public and rely on controlled anonymity like tellM and Rumr. In this case, users only interact with their contact list, allowing people to connect with people they know anonymously. Another app, called Anomo, allows for users to start entirely anonymous and then as time progresses users get the option to reveal different aspects about themselves to other users. This type of range of anonymity allows users to try to get to know one another over time. With room for free expression and communication among semi-known identities, there is discussion that with this type of technology a market for political activism in other parts of the world is possible. Anonymous social media websites are used for political expression and platforms. Since the 2016 U.S. presidential election, anonymous social media websites are now a prevalent place in which political expression is asserted. Moreover, anonymous social media can also provide authentic connection to complete anonymous communication. There have been cases where these anonymous platforms have saved individuals from life-threatening situation or spread news about a social cause. Additionally, anonymous social websites also allow internet users to communicate while also safeguarding personal information from criminal actors and corporations that sell users' data.

Another prospective use for anonymous social media is content creation. For example, a study done in 2017 found that about 700,000 unique images had been posted on 4chan's /pol/ board during their study period out of a 1 million studied images suggesting that anonymous social networks can serve as a platform for users to contribute unique digital content.

Revenue generated by anonymous social media

Anonymous apps

Generating revenue from anonymous apps has been a discussion for investors. Since little information is collected about the users, it is difficult for anonymous apps to advertise to users. However some apps, such as Whisper, have found a method to overcome this obstacle. They have developed a "keyword-based" approach, where advertisements are shown to users depending on certain words they type. Another app named Yik Yak has been able to capitalize on the features they provide. Anonymous apps such a Chrends take the approach of using anonymity to provide freedom of speech. Telephony app Burner has regularly been a top grossing utilities app in the iOS and Android app stores using its phone number generation technology. Despite the success of some anonymous apps, there are also apps, such as Secret, which have yet to find a way to generate revenue. The idea of an anonymous app has also caused mixed opinions within investors. Some investors have invested a large sum of money because they see the potential revenue generated within these apps. Other investors have stayed away from investing these apps because they feel these apps bring more harm than good.

Anonymous sites
There are several sources to generate revenue for anonymous social media sites. One source of revenue is by implementing programs such as a premium membership or a gift-exchanging program. Another source of revenue is by merchandising goods and specific usernames to users. In addition, sites such as FMyLife, have implemented a policy where the anonymous site will receive 50% of profit from apps that makes money off it.

In terms of advertisements, some anonymous sites have had troubles implementing or attracting them. There are several reasons for this problem. Anonymous sites, such as 4chan, have received few advertisement offers due to some of the contents it generates. Other anonymous sites, such as Reddit, have been cautious in implementing them in order to maintain their user base. Despite the lack of advertisements on certain anonymous sites, there are still anonymous sites, such as SocialNumber, that support the idea.

See also
 Anonymous post
 
 Online disinhibition effect

References

Bibliography 

 

 
Social media
Internet privacy software
Anonymity
Internet culture